Mitinskaya is a rural locality (a village) in Orlovskoye Rural Settlement of Ustyansky District, Arkhangelsk Oblast, Russia. The population was 25 as of 2010.

Geography 
Mitinskaya is located on the Ustya River, 31 km east of Oktyabrsky (the district's administrative centre) by road. Koptyayevskaya is the nearest rural locality.

References 

Rural localities in Ustyansky District